Katerina Balkaba (born 11 June 1982) is a Greek cross-country skier. She competed in two events at the 2002 Winter Olympics.

References

External links
 

1982 births
Living people
Greek female cross-country skiers
Olympic cross-country skiers of Greece
Cross-country skiers at the 2002 Winter Olympics
Sportspeople from Naousa, Imathia